Frank Aloysius Burke (February 16, 1880 – September 17, 1946) was an American baseball player who played two seasons in the major leagues. Born in Carbon County, Pennsylvania, Burke played for the New York Giants and the Boston Doves. He died in Los Angeles in 1946.

External links
Frank Burke at Baseball Reference
Frank Burke at Baseball Almanac

1880 births
1946 deaths
Boston Doves players
Major League Baseball outfielders
Baseball players from Pennsylvania
New York Giants (NL) players
New Haven Blues players
Akron Rubbernecks players
New Castle Outlaws players
New Castle Nocks players
Altoona Mountaineers players
Wilkes-Barre/Mount Carmel players
Meriden Silverites players